Awa District may refer to:

Awa District, Chiba, Japan
Awa District, Tokushima, Japan

See also

Awa (disambiguation)